Ab Barik-e Sofla (also Romanized as Āb Bārīk-e Soflá; also known as Āb Bārīk-e Pā‘īn) is a village in Bavaleh Rural District, in the Central District of Sonqor County, Kermanshah Province, Iran. At the 2006 census, its population was 50, in 13 families.

References 

Populated places in Sonqor County